George L. Caldwell (February 3, 1933 – March 3, 2014) was an American politician. He served as a Republican member for the 84th district of the Florida House of Representatives.

Life and career 
Caldwell was born in New York City, the son of William W. Caldwell. He attended Trinity School, St. Paul's School and Princeton University. He served in the United States Navy.

In 1967, Caldwell was elected as the first representative for the newly-established 84th district of the Florida House of Representatives. He served until 1972, when he was succeeded by Van B. Poole.

Caldwell died in March 2014 at his home, at the age of 81.

References 

1933 births
2014 deaths
Politicians from New York City
Republican Party members of the Florida House of Representatives
20th-century American politicians
Princeton University alumni